On Stage Vol. 3 is a live album by saxophonist Clifford Jordan which was recorded in Holland in 1975 and first released on the SteepleChase label in 1979.

Reception

In his review on Allmusic, Scott Yanow notes that "This final installment of a 1975 concert in Amsterdam finds tenor saxophonist Clifford Jordan in fine form... Like the previous two volumes, this one is also recommended"

Track listing 
All compositions by Cedar Walton except as indicated
 "Seven Minds" (Sam Jones) - 13:19   
 "Shoulders" - 6:42   
 "St. Thomas" (Sonny Rollins) - 14:32   
 "Bleecker Street Theme" - 5:20

Personnel 
Clifford Jordan - tenor saxophone
Cedar Walton - piano
Sam Jones - bass
Billy Higgins - drums

References 

Clifford Jordan live albums
1979 live albums
SteepleChase Records live albums